Yang Shih-kuang (born 1976) is a Taiwanese television presenter.

Yang was a television host for the EBC Financial News Channel, and later served as the leader of the New Party Youth Corps. On 2 July 2019, Yang was nominated by the New Party as its candidate for the 2020 Taiwan presidential election. Yang ended his presidential campaign on 1 November 2019.

References

Living people
New Party (Taiwan) presidential nominees
Taiwanese television presenters
1976 births